Happy "Smokey Joe" Finneran (born Joseph Ignatius Finneran; October 29, 1890 in East Orange, New Jersey – February 3, 1942 in Orange, New Jersey) was a pitcher for Major League Baseball in the 1910s.

Sources

Baseball players from New Jersey
Major League Baseball pitchers
1890 births
1942 deaths
Philadelphia Phillies players
Brooklyn Tip-Tops players
Detroit Tigers players
New York Yankees players
Norfolk Tars players
Lowell Grays players
St. Paul Saints (AA) players
Vernon Tigers players
Akron Buckeyes players
Newark Bears (IL) players
Seattle Indians players
Toledo Mud Hens players
Sportspeople from East Orange, New Jersey